Mimsville is an extinct town in Baker County, in the U.S. state of Georgia. The GNIS classifies it as a populated place.

History
The first permanent settlement at Mimsville was made about 1880. A post office called Mimsville was established in 1884, and remained in operation until 1914. The community was named after Robert L. Mims, a local storekeeper.

See also
 Ghost town
Cheevertown, Georgia
Dewsville, Georgia

References

Geography of Baker County, Georgia
Ghost towns in Georgia (U.S. state)